Norby Williamson (born  1963) is an American executive and television producer. He is the Executive Senior Vice President of Studio and Event Production for ESPN. Since October 2005, Williamson has overseen all studio shows as well as all live sporting events on ESPN networks. 

Williamson was born in central Connecticut in the early 1960s. He graduated from Southern Connecticut State University with a bachelor's degree in corporate and video communications. He began his career in the ESPN mailroom in the 1980s. He was the first producer for SportsCenter.

In 2006, Williamson placed #67 on The Sporting News Power 100.

In September 2017, Williamson became ESPN's executive vice president of studio production. He was formerly critical of Stuart Scott's "Boo-Yah!" catchphrase and once told Bob Ley that his beard looked stupid.

References

External links
ESPN bio

1960s births
Living people
ESPN executives
Year of birth missing (living people)